Pain Again is the debut studio album by Varials. It was released on August 11, 2017 through Fearless Records.

Background
Varials signed with Fearless Records on July 6, 2017, and announced their debut album Pain Again, produced by Josh Schroeder, would be released on August 11. The lead single, "Anything to Numb" was released alongside a music video that day. The second single, "Pain Again" was released on July 28 with another music video. The song "E.D.A." had a music video released on August 10. The music video for the third single "Empire of Dirt", was released in May 2018.

Track listing

Notes
"E.D.A." is stands for "Everyone Dies Alone".

Personnel
Travis Tabron - vocals
Mitchell Rogers - lead guitar
James Hohenwarter - rhythm guitar
Mike Foley - bass
Sean Rauchut - drums

References

External links

Pain Again at YouTube (streamed copy where licensed)

2017 debut albums
Fearless Records albums
Varials albums